The Battle of Rumbo was fought during the East African Campaign of World War I.

References

 http://www.kaiserscross.com/188001/433401.html

Rumbo
1917 in Africa
Rumbo
Rumbo
Rumbo
Rumbo
August 1917 events
1917 in German East Africa